Toothfish Day is a public holiday celebrated in the British Overseas Territory of South Georgia and the South Sandwich Islands.  It is annually on 4 September, but if that falls on a weekend it may be observed on a weekday.  It is one of eleven public holidays in South Georgia and the South Sandwich Islands, appointed by the Governor in Council.

The holiday marks the end of the toothfish (Dissostichus, also called Chilean sea bass) fishing season.  Locals (which at this time of year number around 16) celebrate with a toast.  Some bake gingerbread toothfish cookies.  The Government of South Georgia and the South Sandwich Islands (GSGSSI) celebrates with a Toothfish Day Reception at Government House in Stanley.  The reception includes a quiz, a toast, and a menu featuring many dishes made with toothfish.  GSGSSI also holds meetings and a reception in London to mark the occasion.

The holiday was created to show the importance of the Patagonian toothfish (Dissostichus eleginoides) fishery and to spotlight the sustainable fishing practices of the industry in the territory.  The holiday dates back to at least 2012, when it was called "Toothfish (end of season) Day" and took place on 14 September.  The holiday replaced a previously undesignated bank holiday.  It remained under that name and stayed in mid-September until 2015 when it was instituted as simply Toothfish Day and moved to 4 September.

Past dates

References

South Georgia and the South Sandwich Islands culture
September observances
Fauna of South Georgia and the South Sandwich Islands
Dissostichus